The Second River, or Watsessing River, in the state of New Jersey in the United States, is the second main tributary of the Passaic River encountered while travelling upstream from its mouth at Newark Bay.

From its source in West Orange to the Passaic, it is approximately 5 mi (8 km) long.

From West Orange, the Second River passes generally easterly through the towns of Orange and East Orange, where it is joined by Wigwam, Parrow, and Nishuane Brooks, then turns slightly to the north (though still generally easterly), and enters the town of Bloomfield.  Here, at Watsessing Park, it is joined by Toney's Brook.

After leaving Bloomfield, it enters the town of Belleville (which was, early in its history, also named "Second River"), and turns slightly to the south (though still generally easterly).  Soon into Belleville, it forms the border between Belleville and Newark.  Finally, it joins the Passaic River, on its way to Newark Bay.

In the 19th and early 20th centuries, the Second River supported a sizable industrial complex of mills and factories.

The Reformed Dutch Church of Second River is named after this river.

Tributaries
(As encountered travelling upstream):
 Toney's Brook
 Nishuane Brook
 Parrow Brook
 Wigwam Brook

See also
 List of rivers of New Jersey

Rivers of New Jersey
Bloomfield, New Jersey
Rivers of Essex County, New Jersey
Tributaries of the Passaic River
The Oranges, New Jersey